Berdavan may refer to:
 Berdavan, Armenia
 Berdavan Fortress